The 2008–09 Azadegan League was the 18th season of the Azadegan League and eight as the second highest division since its establishment in 1991. The season featured 22 teams from the 2007–08 Azadegan League, two new teams relegated from the 2007–08 Persian Gulf Cup: Sanat Naft and Shirin Faraz and four new teams promoted from the 2007–08 2nd Division: Aluminium Hormozgan as champions and Mehrkam Pars, Payam Mokhaberat and Petroshimi Tabriz. Sanaye Arak changed their name into Aluminium Arak. The league started on 23 October 2008 and ended on 8 June 2009. Steel Azin and Tractor Sazi won the Azadegan League title for the first time in their history. Steel Azin, Tractor Sazi and Shahin Bushehr promoted to the Persian Gulf Cup.

Standings

Group A

Group B

Results table

Group A
Last updated June 7, 2009

Group B
Last updated June 7, 2009

Player statistics

Top goalscorers
17
  Abbas Porkhosravani (Gol Gohar)

Group A
17
  Abbas Porkhosravani (Gol Gohar)

11
  Mostafa Shojaei (Sepahan Novin)
  Akbar Saghiri (Petroshimi Tabriz F.C.)
9
  Rouhollah Arab (Sanat Naft Abadan F.C.)

Group B
14
  Mohammad Ahmadpouri (Shirin Faraz)

12
  Nima Ghavidel (Niroye Zamini)
  Mohammad Ebrahimi (Mokhaberat Shiraz)

9
  Amir Mohebi (Tractor Sazi F.C.)

Play Off
First leg to be played June 15, 2009; return leg to be played June 22, 2009

First leg

Return leg

Attendances

Average home attendances

Highest attendances

Notes:Updated to games played on 8 June 2009. Source: iplstats.com

See also
 2008–09 Persian Gulf Cup
 2008–09 Iran Football's 2nd Division
 2008–09 Hazfi Cup
 2008–09 Iranian Futsal Super League

References

Lig1.ir
League 1 Program Website

Azadegan League seasons
Iran
2008–09 in Iranian football leagues

hr:Lige Azadegan